The 2008–09 season was Southampton's fourth consecutive season in the Football League and their fourth also in the Championship.

Season summary
Having narrowly avoided relegation the previous season, Southampton looked to improve their position in the league in 2008–09. The season was even more disappointing, however, as the Saints finished second from bottom to be relegated to League One, which they would start with a ten-point deduction as a result of its parent company, Southampton Leisure Holdings PLC, entering administration. The season was equally unsatisfactory in the cup tournaments, as the club were knocked out of both the FA Cup and the League Cup in the third round, losing 0–3 to Premier League champions Manchester United and 1–3 to League Two side Rotherham United. The season was worsened still by a change in management – head coach Jan Poortvliet resigned from the club on 23 January 2009, and youth academy manager Mark Wotte took over for the remainder of the season.

Championship

Pld = Matches played; W = Matches won; D = Matches drawn; L = Matches lost; GF = Goals for; GA = Goals against; GD = Goal difference; Pts = Points

FA Cup

League Cup

Squad statistics

Transfers

In

Out

Loan in

Loan out

References

Southampton F.C. seasons
Southampton